Transfeminism, also written trans feminism is a branch of feminism focused on transgender women and informed by transgender studies.

History
Early voices in the movement include Kate Bornstein, author of 1994 Gender Outlaw: On Men, Women, and the Rest of Us, and Sandy Stone, author of essay "The Empire Strikes Back: A Posttranssexual Manifesto", which included a direct response to Janice Raymond's writings on transsexuality. In the 21st century, Krista Scott-Dixon and Julia Serano have published transfeminist works. Bornstein has also released new works, such as Gender Outlaws: The Next Generation in 2010 with S. Bear Bergman. Susan Stryker and Talia M. Bettcher have also recently released a publication about transfeminism.

Patrick Califia used the word in print in 1997, and this remains the first known use in print outside of a periodical. It is possible or even likely that the term was independently coined repeatedly before the year 2000 (or even before Courvant's first claimed use in 1992). The term gained traction only after 1999. Jessica Xavier, an acquaintance of Courvant, may have independently coined the term when she used it to introduce her articles, "Passing As Stigma Management" and "Passing as Privilege" in late 1999.

In the past few decades, the idea that all women share a common experience has come under scrutiny by women of color, lesbians, and working class women, among others. Many transgender people are also questioning what gender means, and are challenging gender as a biological fact. Transfeminists insist that their unique experiences be recognized as part of the feminist sphere.

Transfeminism incorporates all major themes of third wave feminism, including diversity, body image, self-definition, and women's agency. It also includes critical analysis of second wave feminism from the perspective of the third wave. It critiques mainstream notions of masculinity and argues that women deserve equal rights and shares the unifying principle with other feminisms that gender is a patriarchal social construct used to oppress women. The "trans" in transgender has been used to imply transgressiveness. Nicholas Birns categorizes transfeminism as "a feminism that defines the term 'trans-' in a maximally heterogeneous way."

The road to legitimacy for transfeminism as a concept has been different and more vexed than for other feminisms. Marginalized women of trans background and affect have had to prove that their needs are different and that mainstream feminism does not necessarily speak for them. Contrarily, trans women must show their womanhood is equally valid as that of other women, and that feminism can speak for them without ceasing to be feminism. Radical feminist Janice Raymond's resistance to considering trans women as women and as participants in feminism is representative of this obstacle. Her career began with The Transsexual Empire (a book-length analysis of transsexual women) and she has often returned to this theme.

In 2006, the first book on transfeminism, Trans/Forming Feminisms: Transfeminist Voices Speak Out edited by Krista Scott-Dixon, was published by Sumach Press.

Compared to other feminisms

Common foundations
A core tenet of feminism is that biology does not and must not equal destiny. Feminists have traditionally explored the boundaries of what it means to be a woman. Transfeminists argue that trans people and cisgender feminists confront society's conventional views of sex and gender in similar ways. Transgender liberation theory offers feminism a new vantage point from which to view gender as a social construct, even offering a new meaning of gender.

Transfeminist critics of mainstream feminism say that as an institutionalized movement, feminism has lost sight of the basic idea that biology is not destiny. In fact, they argue, many feminists seem perfectly comfortable equating sex and gender and insisting on a given destiny for trans persons based on nothing more than biology. Transfeminism aims to resist and challenge the fixedness of gender that, as many of its supporters believe, traditional approaches to women's studies depend upon.

Transgender people are frequently targets of anti-trans violence. While cis women also routinely face violence, transfeminists recognize anti-trans violence as a form of gender policing.

Differences
Transfeminism stands in stark contrast to mainstream second-wave feminism. Transfeminists often criticize the ideas of a universal sisterhood, aligning more with intersectionality and with the mainstream third wave's appreciation for the diversity of women's experience.

According to Julia Serano femininity in transgender women is noticed and punished much more harshly than the same behaviors in cisgender women. This double standard reveals that the behavior itself is not as problematic to many critics as the existence of trans people. Julia Serano refers to the breed of misogyny experienced by trans women as 'transmisogyny'. 

Citing their common experience, many transfeminists directly challenge the idea that femininity is an entirely social construction. Instead, they view gender as a multifaceted set of diverse intrinsic and social qualities. For example, there are both trans and cis persons who express themselves in ways that differ from society’s expectations of feminine and masculine.

Access to feminist spaces
Though little acknowledged, trans people have been part of feminist movements. There have been a number of documented occasions when the trans people portrayed as bad actors were in fact the victims of overreactions by others.

Lesbian feminism and transfeminism

In Living a Feminist Life (2017), Sara Ahmed imagines lesbian feminism as a fundamental and necessary alliance with trans feminism. Ahmed argues an anti-trans stance is an anti-feminist stance and one that works against the feminist project of creating worlds to support those for whom gender fatalism (i.e. boys will be boys, girls will be girls) is deleterious.

Radical feminism and transfeminism

Some radical feminists have expressed anti-trans viewpoints. For example, in Gender Hurts (2014), Sheila Jeffreys argued that trans feminism amounted to men exercising their authority in defining what women are.  

Some radical feminists are supportive of trans rights. The radical feminist writer and activist Andrea Dworkin, in her book Woman Hating, argued against the persecution and hatred of transgender people and demanded that sex reassignment surgery be provided freely to transgender people by the community. Dworkin argued that "every transsexual has the right to survival on his/her own terms. That means every transsexual is entitled to a sex-change operation, and it should be provided by the community as one of its functions."

Some transgender women have been participants in lesbian feminism and radical feminism. A prominent example is Sandy Stone, a trans lesbian feminist who worked as a sound technician for the lesbian-feminist Olivia Records. In June and July 1977, when twenty-two feminists protested Stone's participation, Olivia Records defended her employment by saying that Stone was a "woman we can related to with comfort and trust" and that she was "perhaps even the Goddess-sent engineering wizard we had so long sought."

Allegations of transphobia in radical feminism

Radical feminist Janice Raymond's 1979 book, The Transsexual Empire, was and still is controversial due to its unequivocal condemnation of transgender surgeries.  Raymond says, "All transsexuals rape women's bodies by reducing the real female form to an artifact, appropriating this body for themselves .... Transsexuals merely cut off the most obvious means of invading women, so that they seem non-invasive."

In the early 1990s Michigan Womyn's Music Festival ejected a transgender woman, Nancy Burkholder, After that, the festival maintained that it is intended for "womyn-born-womyn" only. The activist group Camp Trans formed to protest the transphobic "womyn-born-womyn" policy and to advocate for greater acceptance of trans people within the feminist community. A number of prominent trans activists and transfeminists were involved in Camp Trans including Riki Wilchins, Jessica Xavier, and Leslie Feinberg. The festival considered allowing post-operative trans women to attend; however, this was criticized as classist, as many trans women cannot afford genital surgery. Since this incident, the Michigan Womyn’s Music Festival has updated their community statements page. This page now includes a list of links to letters and statements such as their August 2014 response to Equality Michigan’s Call For Boycott and a list of demands in response to the Equality Michigan call to boycott. The initial response to the boycott states that the MWMF believes that “support for womyn-born-female space is not at odds with standing with and for the transgender community”.

Kimberly Nixon is a trans woman who volunteered for training as a rape crisis counselor at Vancouver Rape Relief in Vancouver, British Columbia in 1995. When Nixon's transgender status was determined, she was expelled. The staff decided that Nixon's status made it impossible for her to understand the experiences of their clients, and also required their clients to be genetically female. Nixon disagreed, disclosing her own history of partner abuse and sued for discrimination. Nixon's attorneys argued that there was no basis for the dismissal, citing Diana Courvant's experiences as the first publicly transgender woman to work in a women-only domestic violence shelter. In 2007 the Canadian Supreme Court refused to hear Nixon's appeal, ending the case.

Transgender women such as Sandy Stone challenged the mainstream second-wave feminist conception of "biological woman". Stone worked as a sound engineer for Olivia Records from about 1974 to 1978, resigning as the controversy over a trans woman working for a lesbian-identified enterprise increased. The debate continued in Raymond's book, which devoted a chapter to criticism of "the transsexually constructed lesbian-feminist." Groups like Lesbian Organization of Toronto instituted "womyn-born womyn only" policies. A formal request to join the L.O.O.T. was made by a male-to-female transgender lesbian in 1978. In response, the organization voted to exclude trans women. During informal discussion, members of L.O.O.T expressed their outrage that in their view a "sex-change he-creature...dared to identify himself as a woman and a lesbian." In their public response, L.O.O.T. wrote:

A woman's voice was almost never heard as a woman's voice - it was always filtered through men's voices. So here a guy comes along saying, "I'm going to be a girl now and speak for girls." And we thought, "No you're not." A person cannot just joined the oppressed by fiat.

Issues within transfeminism

Inclusion in mainstream feminism
According to Graham Mayeda, women who identify as right-wing feel that issues of equality and female importance becomes less significant when the biology of trans people, specifically, male-to-female trans people, is mentioned. He noted that these feminists feel that the biological nature of trans-females confuse "women only" boundaries and could contradict or disrupt feminist goals of establishing a voice in a patriarchal world.

Groups such as the Lesbian Avengers accept trans women, while others reject them. The Violence Against Women Act now "explicitly protects transgender and lesbian, gay, and bisexual survivors", such that domestic violence centers, rape crisis centers, support groups, and other VAWA-funded services cannot turn away any person due to their sex, gender identity or expression, or sexual orientation.

Gender dysphoria
Gender dysphoria describes the condition of people who experience significant dysphoria with the sex assignment that they were given at birth, or the gender roles associated with that sex. The term "gender identity disorder" (GID) is also frequently used especially in the formal diagnosis used amongst psychologists and physicians.
Gender identity disorder was classified as a medical disorder by the ICD-10 CM and DSM-4. The DSM-5 uses the less pathologizing term gender dysphoria, and the ICD-11 uses the term gender incongruence. Many transgender individuals, transfeminists and medical researchers support the declassification of GID because they say the diagnosis pathologizes gender variance, reinforces the binary model of gender, and can result in stigmatization of transgender individuals. Many transfeminists and traditional feminists also propose that this diagnosis be discarded because of its potentially abusive use by people with power, and may argue that gender variation is the right of all persons. When arguing for the previous diagnostic category, pro-GID transfeminists typically concede past misuse of the diagnosis while arguing for greater professional accountability.

In many situations or legal jurisdictions, transgender people have insurance coverage for surgery only as a consequence of the diagnosis. Removal would therefore increase patient costs. In other situations, anti-discrimination laws which protect legally disabled people apply to transgender people only so long as a manifest diagnosis exists. In other cases, transgender people are protected by sex discrimination rules or as a separate category. This economic issue can split advocates along class lines.

At the 2006 Trans Identity Conference at the University of Vermont, Courvant presented an analysis of this controversy. She noted that "eliminationists" must decide whether their efforts to destigmatize trans people conflict with efforts to destigmatize mental illness and whether removing the GID category would actually help with the former, while disrupting the current, albeit limited, insurance regime. Conversely, "preservationists" must address the problem of faulty diagnoses and improper "treatment". She proposed retaining the category and focusing efforts on legitimating mental illness and improving acceptance of trans people, leaving aside the diagnosis question.

See also

 Feminism movements and ideologies
 Feminist views on transgender topics
 Fourth-wave feminism
 Heteropatriarchy
 Heterosexism
 List of transgender-related topics
 Queer theory

References

Works cited
 
 
 
 
 

 
LGBT feminism
Feminism and history
Feminism and transgender
Feminist theory
Intersectional feminism
Third-wave feminism
Transgender studies